Brothers in the Saddle is a 1949 Western film directed by Lesley Selander. Virginia Cox makes her film debut.

Plot
The film revolves about Tim Taylor, a cowboy. He tries to convince and reform his younger brother, Steve. Steve killed a man in self defence and became outlaw.

Cast
 Tim Holt as Tim Taylor
 Steve Brodie as Steve Taylor
 Richard Martin as Chito Rafferty
 Virginia Cox as Nancy Austin
 Carol Forman

Reception
The film recorded a loss to RKO of $35,000.

References

External list

1949 films
American Western (genre) films
1949 Western (genre) films
RKO Pictures films
American black-and-white films
Films directed by Lesley Selander
1940s American films